Leopold is a biennial German media prize for music for children, subtitled "Gute Musik für Kinder" (Good music for children).

From 2001, the broadcaster Westdeutscher Rundfunk has been a cultural partner of the VdM. Therefore, the award ceremonies are normally held at the hall  in Cologne.

External links 
 

German music awards